Saint-Christophe-en-Bourbonnais (known as Saint-Christophe until 31 December 2022) is a commune in the Allier department in Auvergne-Rhône-Alpes in central France.

Geography
Saint-Christophe-en-Bourbonnais is surrounded by the communes of Billezois, Saint-Prix, Le Breuil, Isserpent, Molles, and Saint-Étienne-de-Vicq.

The south of the commune is rolling hills and valleys, whereas the north is flatter and more favorable to agriculture. Le Mourgon, the principal stream of the commune is 18 km long and separates these two parts.

Population
The population of the commune peaked in the 1890s and has since returned to the level of the 17th century.

Sights
Bruyères Reservoir, known for its fly fishing.
Two 19th-century churches.

See also
Communes of the Allier department

References

Communes of Allier
Allier communes articles needing translation from French Wikipedia